Jeffrey D. Congdon (born October 17, 1943) is an American former basketball player from Garden Grove, California.

Career
Congdon played college basketball at Brigham Young University with teammates Dick Nemelka and Craig Raymond. Congdon was selected by the Detroit Pistons in the 4th round (2nd pick, 32nd overall) of the 1966 NBA draft.

A 6'1" guard, Congdon played for the Anaheim Amigos during part of the 1967–68 American Basketball Association season. Congdon played the remainder of that season with the Denver Rockets, and remained with Denver during the 1968–69 and 1969–70 seasons. Congdon spent the 1970–71 seasons with the Utah Stars (who won the 1971 ABA Championship, though he was traded midseason) and New York Nets. Congdon then joined the Dallas Chaparrals to finish out his professional career during the 1971–72 season.

References

External links

1943 births
Living people
American men's basketball players
Anaheim Amigos players
Basketball players from Wisconsin
BYU Cougars men's basketball players
Denver Rockets players
Detroit Pistons draft picks
New York Nets players
People from Walworth County, Wisconsin
Phillips 66ers players
Utah Stars players
Continental Basketball Association coaches
People from Garden Grove, California
Point guards